Canillas del Aceituno is a town and municipality in the province of Málaga, part of the autonomous community of Andalucía in southern Spain. The municipality is situated approximately 17 kilometres from Vélez Málaga and 51 from the provincial capital. It has a population of approximately 2000 residents. The natives are called Canilleros.

Municipalities in the Province of Málaga